The women's 1500 metres event at the 2011 Summer Universiade was held on 19–21 August.

Medalists

 on 17 August 2015, Aslı Çakır Alptekin relinquished her gold medal after being found guilty of doping.

Results

Heats
Qualification: First 5 in each heat (Q) and the next 2 fastest (q) qualified for the final.

Final

References
Heats results
Final results

1500
2011 in women's athletics
2011